Miguelia monnei is a species of beetle in the family Cerambycidae, and the only species in the genus Miguelia. It was described by Galileo and Martins in 1991.

References

Calliini
Beetles described in 1991
Monotypic Cerambycidae genera